Yashpal Kapoor / Kapur (1929–1993)  was a leader of Indian National Congress and a close aide of Indira Gandhi. Kapoor was member of the Rajya Sabha from Uttar Pradesh from 1972 to 1978. Indira Gandhi's election was declared null and void, and she was banned from contesting any election for an additional six years availing the services of a government officer, Yashpal Kapoor, during the elections before he had resigned from his position.

Early life 

Kapoor grew up in Rawalpindi, Pakistan during the development of the Swadeshi Movement, a self-sufficiency movement that contributed to the rise of Indian nationalism and a corresponding push for independence. These coalesced into the Quit India Movement, which demanded the end of British rule in India. During this time period, Kapoor’s father — who was employed by the British to supervise the development of Delhi City — was given the barracks that now house the Hostel of Miranda College.

The freedom and the ensuing division of the country created a large influx refugee families, who stayed in the same barracks and numbers of cots at night used to be put up and food made for all as a community living had been brought upon all in India.

The completion of studies in free India also gave an opportunity to be employed with the government as a steno-typist in the Ministry of External Affairs Ministry. It was the need of the Prime Minister Pandit Jawaharlal Nehru, who also held the additional charge of the Ministry sought an efficient stenographer who would write letters for him. Mr. Rajan Mathai, the then Secretary deputed Yashpal Kapoor to the PM office.

The challenge and the turning point that came upon Kapoor was that when one day the PM gave the dictation in English and asked him to translate the same in Hindi language and type too. Kapoor was able to take the dictation, but did not even know Hindi, the background being in Punjab which is now part of Pakistan, the languages used were either Persian, Urdu or English. While a senior Hindi journalist helped him out that day, he took upon himself to master the language and became the only point of translator for the PM there onward.

Life dedicated to Indira Gandhi 

The untimely death of Pandit Jawaharlal Nehru in 1964, created an upheaval for all connected and it was Indira Gandhi who continued the services of Kapoor with herself.  As he was already coordinating the constituency of Rae Bareli, in 1966 when she decided to run for parliamentary elections, Kapoor was the natural choice to be sent for the ground coordination and was later appointed as her political secretary in Rae Bareli.

During the period starting 1966 to 1972, Kapoor served the Late Prime Minister Indira Gandhi as an OSD and then as a Political Advisor. Before leaving the office of the PM, Kapoor ensured seamless functioning of the office and had by then trained his nephew R.K. Dhawan, who was on deputation from a Ministry, to be permanent at PM office and serve the office as PS to PM.

Rajya Sabha

The resounding victory of the elections was the full-time entry of Kapoor in Politics when of Indira Gandhi asked Kapoor to get elected from Uttar Pradesh in the Upper House of Parliament - Rajya Sabha in 1972. It was the elections of 1971 and the minor fault of the Under Secretary of the Min of Personnel & Administration who delayed the formalising of the resignation letter from the government services submitted by Kapoor before going to Rae Bareli as the Election Agent of Gandhi, which was utilised by the opposition to countermand the elections from the Allahabad High Court and Gandhi had to be step down. The mystery of how this was managed and utilised by the defeated opponent Raj Narain could not be unraveled, and it still remains a mystery in the archives of the records of this country.

To arrest the proposed unrest by the opposition who had all come together against the PM who had to take many leaders under house arrest From the opposition during the Emergency Rule, which many liked and many disliked too.

In 1977, after the end of the Emergency period and fresh elections, the people of India voted Janata Party to power, which was a combination of various political parties pooled together. As there was mixed leadership, hence mixed action which led to onslaught on the erstwhile Gandhi and she was jailed multiple times over supposed jeep scams, etc. and along with her trusted aides including Kapoor.

1980 elections 

The unrest of the sitting government called for fresh elections in the country. Gandhi wanted to visit the maximum number of people across the country and Kapoor was given the daunting task of planning her all India tour.

With the sitting government ensuring ill means to curtail her movement, Kapoor utilized every single connect, person, learning, experience of past 32 years and made her fly, drive, ride, walk across the length and breadth of the nation which she in her might of serving the people of the country rightfully took on the task and completed the outcome whereby citizens of India finally understood the designs and gave complete and compromised mandate to Indira Gandhi.

After the elections, the stories of how the erstwhile government had tried to stall her planes, helicopters, cars, trucks, jet fuel, vehicle fuel and road blocks had been overcome by Gandhi brought the actual picture of the work that had been put in by Kapoor to ensure his leader won the election in a full mandate.

Life for Kapoor literally came to an end on the assassination of the Gandhi in 1984. Rajiv Gandhi her son was brought in by the people of the country and appointed the Prime Minister of India. the elections of 1984 December were called and the PM again called upon Kapoor to draw his national tour as he had done for the Late PM for her elections.

The country gave a resounding victory to the son of the slain PM and Prime Minister Rajiv Gandhi created history on his winning the elections with 404 then and later 414 seats in the parliament. Always looking after his family, Kapoor again asked PM Rajiv Gandhi to induct R. K. Dhawan back into his office to serve as he was the late PM.

National Herald 

While serving the congress Party and organisation one of the biggest events on the Celebrations of 90 years also got the charge of the Associated Journals Ltd., which owned the publications like National Herald the English Daily Newspaper,  Hindi Daily Navjeevan and Urdu Daily Qaumi Awaz. The responsibility resided with Kapoor till 1987 during which the mammoth number of people were supported by many believing in the papers started by Pandit Jawhar Lal Nehru.

The publication expanded across India with multiple editions and real estate was acquired for establishing printing press. In 1987 then PM Rajiv Gandhi decided to re-initiate the publications under a new management.

Parting ways from the Congress

The coterie of the PM took over the reins and ensured the distancing of many trusted persons of the late PM, one of them was Kapoor.

In 1990, his dying wife who had been diagnosed with cancer sought him to fight back his place and Kapoor not denying her last wish, decided to run for elections in 1991 from Rae Bareli with the support of Samajvadi Janata Party led by Prime Minister Chandra Shekhar. The prowess of Kapoor on making the national tours was known to PM Chandra Shekhar and he requested Kapoor to make his tour too. This action kept Kapoor away from Rae Bareli till the last days of electioneering which led to his minimal interaction with people and lost the elections.

Personal life 
The blood cancer of his wife Kailash had spread and she was slowly dying. Kapoor gave up everything and decided to serve her in her last days. She died on 30 October 1992 and he followed her four months later on 1 March 1993 leaving behind five children of which the three were children Ashwani, Ashok and Ambika. The two elder children Anjali and Ajay had been adopted by Kapoor's in-laws in infancy.

References

1929 births
1993 deaths
Rajya Sabha members from Uttar Pradesh
Indian National Congress politicians from Uttar Pradesh
People of the Emergency (India)